My Ticket Home is an American heavy metal band formed in 2008 from Columbus, Ohio. They have released two EPs and three full-length albums. Their first three releases exemplified metalcore and hardcore punk, while 2013's Strangers Only marked a departure into a style fusing both metalcore and nu metal; called nu metalcore, as well as being called grunge. The band refers to their newer music as "puke rock."

Members
Current members
 Nick Giumenti – unclean vocals , clean vocals, bass , lead guitar 
 Marshal Giumenti – drums , backing vocals 
 Matt Gallucci – lead guitar , backing vocals 
 Derek Blevins – rhythm guitar, backing vocals 

Former members
 Jeremy Flowers – lead vocals 
 Nick Salemi – keyboards, additional unclean vocals 
 Matt Seidel – lead guitar 
 Eli Ford – lead guitar 
 Sean Mackowski – rhythm guitar , clean vocals 
 Luke Fletcher – bass , backing vocals 

 Timeline

Discography

Studio albums
 To Create A Cure (2012) No. 45 Billboard Indie, No. 12 Billboard Heatseekers
 Strangers Only (2013)
 UnReal (2017)

EPs
 Above the Great City (2009)
 The Opportunity To Be (2010)

Singles
 "A New Breed" (2012)
 "Thrush" (2017)
 "Hyperreal" (2017)
 "We All Use" (2017)
 "Flypaper" (2017)
 "We’re in This Together" (Nine Inch Nails cover) (2018)
 "Through The Needle’s Eye" (2018)

Music videos
 "A New Breed" (2012)
 "Hot Soap" (2014)
 "Spit Not Chewed" (2014)
 "Ayahuasca" (2015)
 "Hyperreal" (2017)
 "Flypaper" (2018)
 "Time Kills Everything" (2018)

References

External links

 
 

Musical groups established in 2008
Metalcore musical groups from Ohio